The Wingatui railway station, sometimes known as the Wingatui Junction railway station, is a former station between Dunedin and Mosgiel in Otago, New Zealand. On the Main South Line, it is the junction for the Otago Central Railway (now the Taieri Gorge Railway run by Dunedin Railways)

It served the settlement of Wingatui. It has an island platform, and used to have a platform for the racecourse at Wingatui.

The present building erected in 1914 was designed by the notable architect George Troup.

The station  and signal box  are listed by the Rail Heritage Trust.

Both the railway station and the signal box  have a New Zealand Historic Places Trust Category II classification (No 2360 & No 2359).

The station was opened on 1 September 1875 and closed on 13 August 1983. The racecourse platform was opened in February 1898.

References

Defunct railway stations in New Zealand
Rail transport in Otago
Railway stations opened in 1875
Railway stations closed in 1983
Heritage New Zealand Category 2 historic places in Otago
Buildings and structures in Otago